The Datong River, known as the Julak Chu in Amdo Tibetan, is a river in China in the Yellow River basin. It has an average annual flow of 90.5 cubic meters per second. It was previously spelled Tatung in English.

The river forms in Tianjun County, part of Qinghai Province's Haixi Mongol and Tibetan Autonomous Prefecture.  It then flows easterly separating the Qilian Mountains from the Daban Mountains.  The main centre of population along its length here is Menyuan.  The Datong meets the Huangshui River at Qinghai's border with Gansu. While it is a tributary of the Huangshui in name, the Datong is actually the main stem of the Huangshui River system and is considerably longer than the Huangshui.

References

Rivers of China